Speed of Love may refer to:

 "Speed of Love", a 2019 song by Florida Georgia Line from Can't Say I Ain't Country
 "Speed of Love", a 2012 song by Owl City from The Midsummer Station